Asus Transformer Pad TF700T or Asus Transformer Pad Infinity - is a tablet computer made by Asus, successor to the Asus Transformer Prime. The manufacturer announced it at CES 2012, less than a month after the original product launch, to launch Q2 2012.

This new model includes a Tegra 3 T33 processor clocked at 1.6 GHz (as opposed to the Prime's T30), and an upgraded 1,920×1,200-pixel-resolution screen, more than doubling the pixel count of the prior model. The display was upgraded to a Super IPS+ panel for ultra bright outdoor readability with 178° wide viewing angles.  In response to the signal problems it includes a new back-panel design with the upper part made of plastic to enhance Wi-Fi, Bluetooth, and GPS performance. The front camera was boosted from 1.2 megapixels to 2 megapixels. It has improved graphics performance with a 12-core GPU.

Successor

In November 2013 a successor was released by the name of Asus Transformer Pad Infinity TF701.
The new Transformer Pad was upgraded with a Tegra 4 CPU, a 2560 x 1600 resolution display with 300 ppi, 2GB RAM and other upgrades over its predecessor.

CyanogenMod 

CyanogenMod 11 or newer is supported on the TF700T tablet.

References

Tablet computers
Android (operating system) devices
Tablet computers introduced in 2012
Asus products